Battle Circus may refer to:

Battle Circus (film), a 1953 film starring Humphrey Bogart
Battle Circus (band), a progressive rock band from New Zealand
Battle Circus (album), Battle Circus's eponymous debut album